Castledermot GAA is a Gaelic Athletic Association (GAA) club in Castledermot, County Kildare, Ireland, winner of three senior hurling championships, first winners of the intermediate football and senior camogie championships, Kildare Club of the year in 2004 and home club of All Ireland football finalist of 1935 Pat Byrne, who played for the club 1925-1942. Jimmy Curran  was goalkeeper on the Kildare hurling team of the millennium.

History
Castledermot GAA was founded at a meeting attended by a dozen people and chaired by Fr Ryan CC on February 17, 1889. RIC records from 1890 show four clubs in the area. Castledermot had 40 members with officers listed as J Lyon, Matt Lawlor, Pat Byrne and Richard Germane. Ballyhade Pallatine had 70 members with Michael Malone, Pat Doyle and John Hoel recorded as officers. Graney club had 50 members, with P McLaughlin, Peter Byrne, Michael Kavanagh and James Murray recorded as officers. Kilkea Geraldines had 40 members with PJ Kennedy, William Farrell, John B Ryan and Martin Lawlor recorded as officers. The club played at Barnhill, moved to Abbeyland and to their current grounds at Woodlands in 1970.

Gaelic Football
Pat Byrne played in two All Ireland finals and won three Railway Cup medals for Leinster. The club won three intermediate championships, but only after the 1932 Intermediate football final against Newbridge was abandoned after a ferocious fight brought it to a premature end and the fight exploded on to the streets of Athy. “Not since the elections of 1927 has a baton been drawn in Athy until last Sunday when owing to the behaviour of the followers of the visiting football teams it became imperative to use force’ the Carlow Nationalist reported. Castledermot won Intermediate championships in 1963 and 1985. In 2007 the Ladies Football Team Won Division 4. It was a great success for the Ladies team.

Hurling
St Dermot’s hurling club was founded by Tipperary natives Tony Ryan and Dermot McKenna in 1958. Martin Duffy, Jack Hanlon and Pat ‘The Barber’ Byrne. Andy Byrne, Jim Curran and Frank Deering features on Kildare’s successful hurling teams of the 1960s and 1970s and Greg Deering spearheaded a team which went to the 1983 senior final. A minor three-in-a-row 1978–80 managed by R.E. Byrne laid the foundation for three senior successes in the 1990s.

Camogie
Founded in 1932 by Cork woman Bridie McCarthy, Castledermot beat Athy and Carbury to win the 1933 and 1934 senior championships. Nine of the eleven Kildare girls to play Wicklow in 1934 came from the club.

Honours
 Kildare Senior Hurling Championship (3) 1988, 1989, 1992
Kildare Junior Hurling Championship (1) 1982
 Kildare Minor Hurling Championship (3) 1978, 1979, 1980
 Kildare Intermediate Football Championship (5) 1928, 1932, 1963, 1985, 2015
 Kildare Junior Football Championship: (3) 1957, 1979. 2004
 Kildare Junior B Football Championship (1) 1956
 Kildare Senior Football League Division 4 (1) 2004
 Keogh Cup Winners (1) 2004
 Kildare Division 4 Junior Football League (1) 2005
 Kildare Senior Camogie Championship (2) 1933, 1934
 Kildare Division 2 Camogie League (1) 2012

Bibliography
 Carbury Gaelic Football Club: A History by John Cummins, Cumann Peile Cairbre Ua gCiardha,. 1984 256pp.
 Kildare GAA: A Centenary History, by Eoghan Corry, CLG Chill Dara, 1984,  hb  pb
 Kildare GAA yearbook, 1972, 1974, 1978, 1979, 1980 and 2000- in sequence especially the Millennium yearbook of 2000
 Soaring Sliothars: Centenary of Kildare Camogie 1904-2004 by Joan O'Flynn Kildare County Camogie Board.

External links
Kildare GAA site
Kildare GAA club sites
Kildare on Hoganstand.com

Gaelic games clubs in County Kildare
Gaelic football clubs in County Kildare
Hurling clubs in County Kildare